is a private women's college in Okayama, Okayama, Japan, run by the Sisters of Notre Dame de Namur. The predecessor of the school, women's school, was founded in 1886, and it was chartered as a university in 1949.

External links
 Official website 

Educational institutions established in 1886
Private universities and colleges in Japan
Okayama
Universities and colleges in Okayama Prefecture
Sisters of Notre Dame de Namur colleges and universities
1886 establishments in Japan
Catholic universities and colleges in Japan
Women's universities and colleges in Japan